Phyllobacterium  is a genus of Gram-negative, oxidase- and catalase-positive, aerobic bacteria.

Phylogeny
The currently accepted taxonomy is based on the List of Prokaryotic names with Standing in Nomenclature (LPSN). The phylogeny is based on whole-genome analysis.

References

   

Phyllobacteriaceae
Bacteria genera